Luxa is a studio album by the electronic artist Harold Budd. It was released in 1996 on All Saints Records.

Track listing 
Butterflies with Tits
1. "Niki D." – 6:30
2. "A Sidelong Glance from My Round Nefertiti" – 3:12
3. "Agnes Martin" – 3:52
4. "Anish Kapoor" – 2:59
5. "Paul McCarthy" – 7:14
6. "Serge Poliakoff" – 3:07
Inexact Shadows
7. "Djinn" – 0:49
8. "Porphyry" – 0:45
9. "How Dark the Response to Our Slipping Away" – 0:47
Smoke Trees
10. "Nove Alberi" – 6:00
11. "Chet" – 7:13
12. "Mandan" – 3:39
13. "Feral" – 4:11
14. "Grace" – 5:18
Laughing Innuendos
15. "Marion Brown (Sweet Earth Flying)" – 2:50
16. "Steven Brown (Pleasure)" – 3:56

References 

 Track titles and times taken from the Amazon.com product page.

Harold Budd albums
1996 albums
All Saints Records albums
Ambient albums by American artists